Catherine Christian (1901–1985) was an English novelist, known for her children’s books and retellings of Arthurian legend. She is classified as having produced 45 works in 85 publications in two languages (English and French) and with 1,019 library holdings. She was also involved with the Girl Guide movement and published several books for girls in the "Ranger" series under the pen name of Patience Gilmour.

Early life
Catherine Christian was born on 22 June 1901 in Chelsea, London, England, the daughter of a German father, Christian John Mühlenkamp, and an English mother, Catherine Harriett (née Ellett, born in Wandsworth in 1873). Christian and Catherine had married in Wandsworth in 1899. 
Her birth was registered as Mamie Muhlenkamp, but the family may have changed their surname during World War I. There is no legal evidence for this name change and Mamie remained "Mulenkamp" in her school records, although later became known as Catherine Mary Christian.

Mamie attended Croydon High School for girls between 25 September 1911 and 25 June 1920, initially at the site in Purley and then from September 1914 at the main school. In 1919 her school records show that she achieved Senior Oxford Class III with subjects  English, History, Religious Knowledge, French, German, Mathematics and Botany.

After leaving school she returned to live at home.

Later life

Christian was a published author during the period 1930 to 1970. She edited The Guide journal from 1939 to 1945. She also made contributions to The Guider, a publication being produced at the same time and edited by her friend Margaret Tennyson. After the war, Christian moved to Devon and was Curator of the Salcombe National Trust Museum (Overbeck's).

Christian was involved in the Guide International Service, and assisted Olga Drahonowska-Małkowska, a former Polish Chief Guide and founder of scouting in Poland, who ran the Polish Children's Home at Hawson Court in Buckfastleigh, Devon.

Christian died on 12 November 1985.

Bibliography

As Catherine Christian

L'aube de la Liberté, publisher unknown
Greenie and the Pink 'Un: a Girl Guide story, illustrated by Gordon Browne, published by "Every Girl's Paper" Office, c1925
The Luck of the Scallop Shell, published by Brown, Son & Ferguson Limited, 1929
Syringa Street, published London, 1930
Cherries in Search of a Captain, Illustrated by Comerford Watson, published by Blackie & Son, c1935
The Legions Go North, published by Cassell & Co., 1935
The Wrong Uncle Jim, published by Edward Arnold & Co., 1935
Great Stories of All Time, illustrated by Alfred Garth Jones, published by Hutchinson, c1936
Baker's Dozen: thirteen stories for girls, published by The Girl's Own Paper, 1937
The Marigolds Make Good, published by Blackie & Son, 1937
A Schoolgirl from Hollywood, illustrated by Ernest Baker, published by Blackie & Son, 1939
Diana Takes a Chance, illustrated by A A Nash, published London by Blackie & Son, 1940
The Pharaoh's Secret, published by Lutterworth Press, 1940
Harriet: The Return of Rip Van Winkle, published by C. Arthur Pearson, 1941
Harriet Takes The Field, published by Pearson, 1942
The Kingfishers See It Through, illustrated by E. Spring-Smith, published by Blackie & Sons, 1942
The School at Emerys End, published London by C Arthur Pearson, 1944
The Silver Unicorn London, published by Hutchinson, 1946
Phyllida's Fortune, published by George Newnes Ltd, 1947
The Big Test: The Story of the Girl Guides in the World War, published by The Girl Guides Association, 1947
The Seventh Magpie, illustrated by E. Spring-Smith, published by Blackie & Son. London, c1948
Sally and the Sixpenny Pig (Read every day library), illustrated by Constance Marshall, published by Blackie, 1960
A Stranger Passed, published by G.P. Putnam's Sons, 1961
Sidney Seeks Her Fortune, published by Peal Press, 1965
Sally Joins the Patrol, published by Peal Press, 1966
The Pendragon, published by Knopf, 1978 and MacMillan, 1981 (as The Sword and the Flame); Warner, 1984

As Patience Gilmour

Three’s a Company, 1935
The Seven Wild Swans: A Story for Rangers, published by Epworth Press, 1936
The Quest of the Wild Swans, 1941
The Cygnets Sail Out, 1943

References

External links 

 LibraryThing

1901 births
1985 deaths
English children's writers
English women novelists
People educated at Croydon High School
People from Chelsea, London
20th-century English women writers
20th-century English novelists
Chief Guides